Samger Football Club is a Gambian football club based in Kanifing near Serrekunda. They play in the top division in Gambian football, the Gambian Championnat National D1.

Stadium
Currently the team plays at the 5,000 capacity Serrekunda East Mini-Stadium.

League participations
Gambian Championnat National D1: 2006–2016, 2018-
Gambian Second Division: 2004–2006, 2017

Achievements
Gambian Championnat National D1: 0

Gambian Cup: 0

Gambian Super Cup: 1
 2008.

References

External links
Soccerway

Football clubs in the Gambia